Loveholic (stylized as LOVEHOLIC or LOVE HOLIC) is the second Japanese extended play by South Korean boy band NCT 127, the multi-national and second sub-unit of NCT. The six-track EP was released on February 17, 2021, by their Japanese record label Avex Trax. It was initially planned for release on December 23, 2020, but was delayed to the final release date due to production issues. The album sold over 133,600 copies in Japan in its first week of release, and debuted atop the Oricon Albums Chart.

Track listing

Charts

Weekly charts

Monthly charts

Year-end charts

Certifications

Release history

References

2021 EPs
SM Entertainment EPs
Japanese-language EPs
Avex Group EPs
NCT 127 albums